SS Athenia was a steam turbine transatlantic passenger liner built in Glasgow, Scotland in 1923 for the Anchor-Donaldson Line, which later became the Donaldson Atlantic Line. She worked between the United Kingdom and the east coast of Canada until 3 September 1939, when a torpedo from the German submarine  sank her in the Western Approaches.

Athenia was the first UK ship to be sunk by Germany during World War II, and the incident accounted for the Donaldson Line's greatest single loss of life at sea, with 117 civilian passengers and crew killed. The sinking was condemned as a war crime. Among those dead were 28 US citizens, causing Germany to fear that the US might join the war on the side of the UK and France. Wartime German authorities denied that one of their vessels had sunk the ship. An admission of responsibility did not come from German authorities until 1946.

She was the second Donaldson ship of that name to be torpedoed and sunk off Inishtrahull by a German submarine. The earlier  was similarly attacked and sunk in 1917.

Construction
The Fairfield Shipbuilding and Engineering Company of Govan in Glasgow built Athenia, launching her on 28 January 1922 and completing her in 1923. She had capacity for 516 cabin class passengers and 1,000 in 3rd class. By 1930 her navigation equipment included wireless direction finding, and by 1934 this had been augmented with an echo sounding device and a gyrocompass.

Career
Athenia was built for Anchor-Donaldson Line, which was a joint venture between Anchor Line and Donaldson Line. Fairfield built a sister ship, which was launched in October 1924 and was completed in 1925. Athenia and Letitia were the two largest ships in Donaldson's various fleets. The ships worked Anchor-Donaldson's trans-Atlantic route linking Liverpool and Glasgow with Quebec and Montreal in summer and to Halifax in winter. After the construction of the Pier 21 immigration complex in Halifax in 1928, Athenia became a more frequent caller at Halifax, making over 100 trips to Halifax with immigrants. In 1935 Anchor Line went into liquidation and Donaldson Line bought most of its assets. In 1936 Donaldson was reconstituted as Donaldson Atlantic Line.

Loss

On 1 September 1939 Athenia, commanded by Captain James Cook, left Glasgow for Montreal via Liverpool and Belfast. She carried 1,103 passengers, including about 500 Jewish refugees, 469 Canadians, 311 US citizens and 72 UK subjects, and 315 crew. Lemp later claimed that the fact that she was a darkened ship steering a zigzag course which seemed to be well off the normal shipping routes made him believe she was either a troopship, a Q-ship or an armed merchant cruiser. U-30 tracked Athenia for three hours until eventually, at 19:40, when both vessels were between Rockall and Tory Island, Lemp ordered two torpedoes to be fired. One exploded on Athenias port side in her engine room, and she began to settle by the stern.

Electras commander, Lt. Cdr. Sammy A. Buss, was senior officer present and took charge. He sent the F-class destroyer  on an anti-submarine sweep of the area, while Electra, another E-class destroyer, the Swedish yacht Southern Cross, the  Norwegian dry cargo ship MS Knute Nelson, and the US cargo ship , rescued survivors. Between them they rescued about 981 passengers and crew. The German liner , en route from New York to Murmansk, also received Athenias distress signal, but ignored it as it was trying to evade capture by the British as a prize of war. City of Flint took 223 survivors to Pier 21 at Halifax, and Knute Nelson landed 450 at Galway.

Athenia remained afloat for more than 14 hours, until she finally sank stern first at 10:40 the next morning. Of the 1,418 aboard, 98 passengers and 19 crew members were killed. Many died in the engine room and aft stairwell, where the torpedo hit. The British crews were said to be famous for putting the passengers' lives before their own, and were expertly trained to handle such "events"; nonetheless, about 50 people died when one of the lifeboats was crushed in the propeller of Knute Nelson.
No. 5A lifeboat came alongside the empty tanker and tied up, against advice, astern of No 12 lifeboat. Only  separated the life boat from the tanker's exposed propeller. Once No. 12 lifeboat was emptied it was cast adrift and began to sink. This fact was reported to the bridge of Knute Nelson. For some reason the ship's engine order telegraph was then set to full ahead. 5A lifeboat's mooring line or "warp" parted under the stress, causing the lifeboat to be pulled back into the revolving propeller.

There was a second accident at about 05:00 hrs when No. 8 lifeboat capsized in a heavy sea below the stern of the yacht Southern Cross, killing ten people. Three passengers were crushed to death while trying to transfer from lifeboats to the Royal Navy destroyers. Other deaths were due to falling overboard from Athenia and her lifeboats, or to injuries and exposure.

54 dead were Canadian and 28 were US citizens, which led to German fears that the incident would bring the US into the war.

Aftermath

It was not until the Nuremberg Trials after the War that the truth of the U-boat sinking of Athenia finally came out.  The sinking was given dramatic publicity throughout the English-speaking world. The front pages of many newspapers ran photographs of the lost ship along with headlines about the UK's declaration of war. For example, the Halifax Herald for 4 September 1939 had a banner across its front page announcing "LINER ATHENIA IS TORPEDOED AND SUNK" with, in the centre of the page, "EMPIRE AT WAR" in outsized red print.

A Canadian girl, 10-year-old Margaret Hayworth, was among the casualties, and was one of the first Canadians to be killed by enemy action. Newspapers widely publicised the story, proclaiming "Ten-Year-Old Victim of Torpedo" as "Canadians Rallying Point", and set the tone for their coverage of the rest of the war. One thousand people met the train that brought her body back to Hamilton, Ontario, and there was a public funeral attended by the mayor of Hamilton, the city council, the Lieutenant-Governor, Albert Edward Matthews, Premier Mitchell Hepburn, and the entire Ontario cabinet.

He therefore told the US chargé d'affaires in good faith that the German Navy had not been responsible. When, on 27 September, U-30 returned to Wilhelmshaven, Lemp reported to Admiral Dönitz that he had sunk Athenia in error. Dönitz at once sent Lemp to Berlin, where he explained the incident to Raeder. In turn, Raeder reported to Hitler, who decided that the incident should be kept secret for political reasons. Raeder decided against court-martialling Lemp because he considered that he had made an understandable mistake, and the log of U-30, which was seen by many people, was altered to sustain the official denials.

A month later the Völkischer Beobachter, the Nazi party's official newspaper, published an article which blamed the loss of Athenia on the UK, accusing Winston Churchill, then First Lord of the Admiralty, of sinking the ship to turn neutral opinion against Germany. Raeder claimed not to have known about this previous to publication and said that if he had known about it, he would have prevented its appearing.

In the US, 60 per cent of respondents to a Gallup poll believed the Germans were responsible, despite their initial claims that Athenia had been sunk by the UK for propaganda purposes, with only 9 per cent believing otherwise. Some anti-interventionists called for restraint while at the same time expressing their abhorrence of the sinking. Boake Carter described it as a criminal act.

Some were not completely convinced that Germany was in fact responsible. Herbert Hoover expressed his doubts, saying, "It is such poor tactics that I cannot believe that even the clumsy Germans would do such a thing", while North Carolina senator Robert Rice Reynolds denied that Germany had any motive to sink Athenia. At best, he said, such an action "could only further inflame the world, and particularly America, against Germany, with no appreciable profits from the sinking." He added that Britain could have had a motive – "to infuriate the American people".

It was not until January 1946, during the case against Admiral Raeder at the Nuremberg trials, that a statement by Admiral Dönitz was read in which he finally admitted that Athenia had been torpedoed by U-30 and that every effort had been made to cover it up. Lemp, who claimed he had mistaken her for an armed merchant cruiser, took the first steps to conceal the facts by omitting to make an entry in the submarine's log, and swearing his crew to secrecy.

After Athenias sinking, conspiracy theories were circulated by pro-Axis and anti-British circles. For example, one editor in Boston's Italian News suggested the ship had been sunk by British mines and blamed on German U-boats to draw America into the war. The claims were unfounded.

Cargo
A cargo of 888 tons was taken on in Glasgow, 472 tons of which were building bricks. Other items included granite curling rocks from Scotland, textbooks for the Toronto school system, a number of sealed steel boxes containing new clothes purchased in Europe by tourists, and watercolour paintings by passenger and English illustrator Winifred Walker, intended for her planned book, Shakespeare's Flowers.

Excavations of Urartu antiquities by the American scholars Kirsopp and Silva Lake during 1938–1940 and most of their finds and field records were lost in the sinking of the ship.

On 4 September 1939, curling stone manufacturer Andrew Kay & Co. sent a cablegram to its sales representative in Toronto stating, "We now learn that the Athenia was this morning sunk off the coast of Scotland, and we regret that the finest consignment of curling stones that have ever yet left our factory has gone with it." According to James Wyllie, secretary and director of Kays of Scotland (as the company is now known) in 2018, three bills of lading for this shipment included 48 pairs of Blue Hone Ailsa curling stones for the London, Ontario Curling Club, 41 pairs of Blue Hone Ailsa curling stones for the Toronto High Park Curling Club, and 50 pairs of Red Hone Ailsa curling stones for the Lindsay Curling Club.

Wreck discovery
In 2017, the oceanographer and marine archaeologist David Mearns found a wreck he believes to be Athenia. Mearns located the wreck on Rockall Bank using sonar imagery that was scanned by the Geological Survey of Ireland to map the sea floor. He stated "Can I go into a court of law and say, '100%, that's Athenia?' No. But barring a photograph I can say in my expert opinion there's a very, very high probability that that's Athenia. Everything fits."

Legality of sinking
As Athenia was an unarmed passenger ship, the attack violated the Hague conventions and the London Naval Treaty of 1930 that allowed all warships, including submarines, to stop and search merchant vessels, but forbade capture as prize or sinking unless the ship was carrying contraband or engaged in military activity. Even if this was the case, and if it was decided to sink their ship, it was required that passengers and crew must be transferred to a "place of safety" as a priority. Although Germany had not signed the 1930 treaty, the German 1936 Prize Rules (Prisenordnung) binding their naval commanders copied most of its restrictions. Lemp of U-30 did none of these things, choosing instead to fire without warning.

Memorials
The lost British members of Athenias crew are commemorated at the Tower Hill Memorial in London. Canadian crew who died are listed at the Halifax Memorial (Sailor's Memorial) at Point Pleasant Park in Halifax, Nova Scotia as well as by special plaque for Hannah Russell Crawford Baird, 66, a civilian stewardess from Montreal, she was the first Canadian killed in the war and is commemorated in a memorial to female merchant mariners in Langford, British Columbia.

Popular culture
No movie has been made of the full story of the sinking, but the film Arise, My Love (1940), directed by Mitchell Leisen and starring Claudette Colbert and Ray Milland, had a sequence involving the torpedoing of the liner.

The song Rollerskate Skinny, written by Rhett Miller and performed by his band The Old 97's, mentions Athenias sinking.

In John Dickson Carr's novel The Man Who Could Not Shudder, Dr Fell announces the end of story by showing his audience a newspaper bearing headline "LINER ATHENIA: FULL LIST OF VICTIMS". He means to say that the Second World War has begun and the truth of the mystery is now unlikely to surface.

The sinking of Athenia is also mentioned in Alyson Richman's novel The Lost Wife about pre-war Prague and how the dreams of two young lovers are shattered when they are separated by the Nazi invasion, their endurance and experiences during World War II and the Holocaust only to find one another again decades later in the United States.

Recent extensive research concerning the incident appears in Cay Rademacher's 2009 book Drei Tage im September – die letzte Fahrt der Athenia, 1939 ("Three Days in September - the Last Voyage of the Athenia, 1939") published by MareVerlag of Hamburg.

In the novel by Norman Collins, London Belongs to Me, he describes the sinking of Athenia as war breaks out across Europe.  As a result of the sinking, Londoners are in no doubt war has started, and start bracing themselves for what's to come. Similarly, at the close of Patrick Hamilton's Hangover Square (1941) the protagonist, George Bone, finds that the newspapers were "all about the sinking of the Athenia".

The sinking of Athenia also forms part of the beginning in the movie U 47 – Kapitänleutnant Prien (1958).

A graphic firsthand account of the sinking and rescue appears as the first chapter of James A. Goodson's autobiographical account of his wartime experiences as a fighter ace.

The sinking of Athenia plays an integral part of the plot of the novel Nemesis by Rory Clements.

Notable individuals aboard
 Andrew Allan, head of CBC Radio Drama, fiancé of Judith Evelyn (his father was lost)
 Barbara Cass-Beggs, British-Canadian teacher, writer and musicologist (her husband and young daughter also survived)
 Judith Evelyn, American stage and film actress (Craig's Wife) (she survived, as did her fiancé, Andrew Allan)
 Thomas Eldreth Finley, Jr., head of Loomis Chaffee in Windsor, Connecticut, and his wife, Mildred Shacklett Finley
 James A. Goodson, future fighter pilot of the RCAF and later USAAF fighter ace
 Richard Stuart Lake, former Saskatchewan Lieutenant-Governor and federal politician, and his wife, Dorothy Schreiber Lake
 Charles Prince, Sr. and Charles Prince, Jr. both from Kittery, Maine, and employees of the Portsmouth Naval Shipyard
 Nicola Lubitsch, ten-month-old daughter of film director Ernst Lubitsch, rescued from the water by her nurse, Carlina Strohmeyer
 Prof. John H. Lawrence, American physicist and MD, later called father of nuclear medicine. He returned to Berkeley, California, and worked with his brother, physicist Ernest O. Lawrence
 Gildas Molgat, future Canadian politician (with his father and two brothers)
 Agnes Sharpe, sitting CCF alderman for Hamilton's Ward Eight, second female elected to Hamilton City Council
 Prof. Charles Wharton Stork, American writer and essayist (Day Dreams of Greece)
 Dr. Edward T. Wilkes, author of books on pediatrics, founder and first president of the Pediatrics Society of New York, and his son (his wife and his other son were lost)
 Margaretta Finch-Hatton, Countess of Winchilsea, widow of Guy Finch-Hatton, 14th Earl of Winchilsea
 Helen Johnson Hannay, daughter of judge Allen Burroughs Hannay
 George Penrose Woollcombe, founder of Ashbury College
 Dr. Lulu Edith Sweigard, colleague of Mabel Elsworth Todd, pioneer of Ideokinesis, author (Human Movement Potential: Its Ideokinetic Facilitation)
 Margaret Doggett, future wife of Trammell Crow and mother of Harlan Crow
 Betty Jane Stewart (1921-2001), Dallas socialite and alumna of the Hockaday School. Future wife of Giles Edwin Miller, co-owner of the 1952 Dallas Texans (NFL), and later, paternal grandmother of singer-songwriter Rhett Miller, frontman for the alternative country band, Old 97's.
 Bill Gadsby, later a Hall of Fame defenceman in the National Hockey League from 1946 to 1966.
 Winifred Walker, award-winning botanical artist and official artist to the English Royal Horticultural Society of Westminster, in England, and later, artist-in-residence at the University of California.

See also
 Laconia incident

Citations

General sources

External links

 
 
 
 
 
 IWM Interview with survivor Mary Bauchop
 IWM Interview with survivor Pax Walker-Fryett
 Anchor-Donaldson Line History and Ephemera (Letitia and Athenia) at the GG Archives
 Roll of Honour

1922 ships
2017 archaeological discoveries
Maritime incidents in Ireland
Maritime incidents in September 1939
Passenger ships of the United Kingdom
Ships built on the River Clyde
Ships sunk by German submarines in World War II
Shipwrecks of Ireland
Steamships of the United Kingdom
World War II merchant ships of the United Kingdom
World War II passenger ships of the United Kingdom
World War II shipwrecks in the Atlantic Ocean